Genevieve O'Reilly (born 6 January 1977) is an Irish actress. She is known for her work in the Star Wars franchise as Mon Mothma, having portrayed the character in Revenge of the Sith, Rogue One, and the Disney+ series  Andor, as well as her voice role as the character in Star Wars Rebels, and as Moira in Overwatch. 

Alongside her appearances in television, O'Reilly is also known for her career in films with her credits in the movie industry notably including the 2004 film Avatar in which she portrayed Dash MacKenzie, the 2009 period drama The Young Victoria in which she played Lady Flora Hastings, and the 2010 romantic movie Forget Me Not where she played Eve. In 2016, O'Reilly appeared in the role of Tarzan's mother in The Legend of Tarzan.

Early life and education
O'Reilly was born on 6 January 1977 in Dublin, Ireland, and raised in Adelaide, Australia. She is the eldest of four siblings. At the age of twenty O'Reilly moved to Sydney to attend the National Institute of Dramatic Art, graduating in 2000.

Personal life
In 2005, she moved to the United Kingdom with her husband, Luke Mulvihill, and lives in East London. They have two children, a son and a daughter.

Career

Theatre
O'Reilly was cast as the understudy in director Gale Edwards' production of The White Devil a week after graduating from drama school. She went on to appear in Edwards' Sydney Theatre Company production of The Way of the World. Other theatre credits include The Weir by Conor McPherson, at the Gate Theatre, Dublin, and Richard II at the Old Vic. Recent parts at the Royal National Theatre have been in new play, Mike Bartlett's 13, and as Helena, wife to Andrew Scott's emperor Julian in the 2011 production of Ibsen's epic Emperor and Galilean. In July 2012, O'Reilly performed in George Bernard Shaw's The Doctor's Dilemma.

In 2015 she played Kathryn in Splendour by Abi Morgan at the Donmar Warehouse.

In 2017, she played Mary Carney in The Ferryman, first at the Royal Court Theatre and later at the Gielgud Theatre in the West End of London.

Film
O'Reilly has appeared in several productions filmed in Australia, including the first two sequels to The Matrix. She  was also in the 2004 Singaporean science fiction film Avatar, playing the lead role of Dash MacKenzie.

Star Wars
In 2005, O'Reilly played the young Mon Mothma in Star Wars: Episode III – Revenge of the Sith, though most of her scenes were ultimately cut. The scenes were included as bonus material for the 2005 DVD release. In 2016, she reprised her role as Mon Mothma in Rogue One: A Star Wars Story, and voiced the same character in the animated TV show Star Wars Rebels in early 2017. In April 2020, she was revealed to be again reprising her role as Mon Mothma in the Disney+ series Andor that premiered in September 2022.

Television

In television, O'Reilly's first appearance was in 2001 in the Canadian television series BeastMaster as a guest star in "Slayer's Return". The following year O'Reilly appeared in Young Lions as Kimberly Oswald in the episode "Asylum Seekers". O'Reilly then appeared as a prominent character in All Saints from 2002 - 2005 as Leanne Curtis. From 2011 to 2014, O'Reilly appeared in the series Episodes as a recurring character alongside Matt LeBlanc. Later in 2014, O'Reilly starred in the television mini series The Honourable Woman as Frances Pirsig in which she starred in six episodes. In the following year of 2015, O'Reilly starred in the BBC television series Banished as Mary Johnson. In 2016, O'Reilly starred in the British drama The Secret from which she gained acclaim and was reported to play her character "beautifully".
In Australia she starred as Leanne Curtis in the medical drama All Saints.
She also starred alongside Tim Roth in Tin Star.

Since moving to the UK, O'Reilly has starred in the political mini-series The State Within, played Princess Diana in the 2007 television docudrama Diana: Last Days of a Princess, and taken the lead role in The Time of Your Life. She played CIA liaison officer Sarah Caulfield in the eighth series of BBC drama Spooks. She played Julie Rees in Harbinger, S9:E1&2 of Waking the Dead broadcast 17 June 2009. O'Reilly also played the character of Michelle Beadley in the remake of The Day of the Triffids that aired on BBC One in December 2009.

In June 2013, O'Reilly appeared in the pilot episode of the international crime drama Crossing Lines cast as detective and interrogation specialist Sienna Pride, attached to the ICC team from Britain's Scotland Yard.

In early 2015, O'Reilly starred as Mary Johnson in Jimmy McGovern's Banished, a television drama focusing on British convicts in an Australian penal colony.

In 2015, O'Reilly starred as Dr Elishia McKellar, in an Australian paranormal drama Glitch, set in fictional small country town called Yoorana. Series 1 with 6 episodes won major awards. Series 2 was broadcast on ABC1 and Netflix toward the end of 2017.

Filmography

Film

Television

Video games

References

External links

Genevieve O'Reilly at United Agents

1977 births
Living people
Actresses from Adelaide
Actresses from Dublin (city)
National Institute of Dramatic Art alumni
Irish emigrants to Australia
Irish emigrants to the United Kingdom
Irish film actresses
Irish Shakespearean actresses
Irish stage actresses
Irish television actresses
Irish video game actresses
Irish voice actresses
20th-century Irish actresses
21st-century Irish actresses